Pol Goossen (born 22 October 1949 in  Lier, Belgium) is a Flemish film and television actor. In 1982 he acted in the movie Het beest, and is known for playing the character of Frank Bomans in over 3200 episodes of the Belgium soap opera series Thuis, a role he acts since start of the series. He is a member of the professional theatre company Paljas Produkties.

Filmography

Television
 De piramide (1981)
 Cello en contrabas (1982) as Kelner
 Het Pleintje (2 episodes, 1986) as Deurwaarder
 Abraham en Samuel (1989) as Abraham
 Het spook van Monniksveer (1989) as Agent
 Omtrent Marleen (1989)
 De weduwnaar (1990)
 Commissaris Roos (1 episode, 1990) as Guido
 Alfa Papa Tango (1 episode, 1991)
 De bossen van Vlaanderen (1991) as Veldwachter
 Bex & Blanche (1 episode, 1993) as Boer Van der Stappen
 Langs de kade (1 episode, 1993)
 Het park 1 (1 episode, 1994) as Agent
 Lili & Marleen (2 episodes, 1994) as Marcel
 Wittekerke (1994–1995) as Rob Buytaert
 Gaston Berghmans Show (1995)
 F.C. De Kampioenen (2 episodes, 1990–1995) as Diederik Legrand
 Thuis (988 episodes, 1995–2013) as Frank Bomans
 Oog in oog" (1995) as Rudy Rombouts
 Editie (1995) as Dokter
 Nonkel Jef (1 episode, 1996) as Garagist
 Heterdaad (1 episode, 1996) as Oswald Nys
 Windkracht 10 (2 episodes, 1997) as Krijgsauditeur
 Over de liefde (1 episode, 1998) as Ronny
 Recht op recht(1 episode, 2001) as Coach
 Oei (2001)
 Thuis extra (2004) as Frank Bomans
 De wet volgens Milo (1 episode, 2004) as Gaston
 Rupel (1 episode, 2004) as Claessen
 Witse (1 episode, 2004) as Marc Deleu
 Mega Mindy (1 episode, 2006) as Boef Verdraff
 Zonde van de zendtijd (2009) as Frank
 Goesting(1 episode, 2010) as Louis

Film
 Het beest (1982) as Inspector
 Walhalla (1995) as Football fan
 Dat ben ik (1996)
 Melt-down (1998)
 Dief! (1998) as Commissaris
 Alias (2002) as Albert
 Plop in de stad (2006) as Busdriver
 Ben X (2007) as Father
 Lang Zullen Ze Leven (2008) as Bert

References

External links
 
 

Living people
1949 births
20th-century Flemish male actors
People from Lier, Belgium
21st-century Flemish male actors
Flemish male television actors
Flemish male film actors